European Journal of Communication is a quarterly peer-reviewed academic journal that covers research on communications and media. The journal was established in 1986 and covers all aspects of communication research and theory.

Abstracting and indexing 
European Journal of Communication is abstracted and indexed in Scopus and the Social Sciences Citation Index. According to the Journal Citation Reports, its 2017 impact factor is 1.500, ranking it 34th out of 84 in the category "Communication".

References

External links
 

Quarterly journals
Publications established in 1986
SAGE Publishing academic journals
English-language journals
Communication journals